The Joyce Hotel, formerly Hotel Treves, is an historic building and former hotel in downtown Portland, Oregon. The building has housed Fish Grotto.

History
The Portland Housing Bureau purchased the building in 2016. In February 2022, work began on an estimated $21 million project to renovate the currently vacant building to provide 66 units of permanent affordable housing, mental health services, and ground-floor retail space.

References

External links

 
 Joyce Hotel at Portland.gov

Buildings and structures in Portland, Oregon
Defunct hotels in Oregon
Southwest Portland, Oregon